Kate Arnell (born Kate Edmondson, 1983 in Portsmouth) is a British television presenter, best known for her work with MTV and CBBC.

Early life
She was born Kate Edmondson in Portsmouth, Hampshire in 1983.

Career
In 2006, she was selected after a nationwide search to present The Loaded Hour,  sponsored by Loaded magazine, on Freeview channel TMF and has since gone on to present TMF Live and TMF Kicks, Totally Boyband Live on sister channel MTV, and Q the Music on Q/The Hits!

She was a radio presenter on Pure FM, the student radio station at the University of Portsmouth, where she read Media Studies. Both her parents worked at the university at the time.

Arnell appeared in the popular CBBC show Hider in the House alongside JK and Joel in 2008, and presented the Teen 24 slot for the BBC News channel.

From 26 October to 7 November 2008, she was also the host for the official webisodes of the Sony Ericsson FanWalk. Eighteen webisodes were released following the fanwalkers for a course of nine days. She also made a cameo appearance on The Legend of Dick and Dom in the episode where the crew have to find the mists of time alongside Chloe Bale, Richard McCourt, Dominic Wood and Steve Furst.

She has occasionally presented the BBC's coverage of the National Lottery Draws, mainly the midweek and Friday EuroMillions draws and in 2013, she co-presented the CBBC show Who Let the Dogs Out and About.

Previously, Kate hosted the (now inactive) YouTube channel "Anglophenia  ", a channel dedicated to all things British. She then went on to create her own YouTube channel "Eco-Boost" in 2015, teaching her viewers about zero-waste living, organic fashion and eco-friendly alternatives. She also wrote a book, "Six Weeks to Zero Waste" in 2020 surrounding these topics.

Personal life 
Kate is married. Her brother, Matt Edmondson, is known for his work with BBC Radio 1 and ITV2.

In 2019, Kate gave birth to her first child, a son named Arthur.

References

External links
 

1983 births
Alumni of the University of Portsmouth
English television presenters
Living people
Mass media people from Portsmouth
British VJs (media personalities)